The Chickasaw Council is a local council of the Boy Scouts of America that serves Scouts in Shelby County, Tennessee, as well as Crittenden county in eastern Arkansas and fifteen counties in northwest Mississippi. It was founded on February 22, 1916, to oversee the many Boy Scout troops already present in Memphis, Tennessee. The Chickasaw Council has two camps: Kia Kima Scout Reservation and Camp Currier. The Chickasaw Council is also home to the Order of the Arrow Ahoalan-Nachpikin Lodge 558.

History
Scouting came to Memphis in 1910 with the founding of Troop 1 by the YMCA at the newly constructed Central YMCA Building at 245 Madison Avenue. Several other troops formed including Troop 25 of Temple Israel, which is still in operation. For the first five years, Memphis area groups affiliated with either the Boy Scouts of America or the American Boy Scouts operated independently of each other. The local board was formed in 1915 which was then organized as the Chickasaw Council of the Boy Scouts of America on February 22, 1916, led by Council President Bolton Smith and Scout Executive Edward Everett.

During World War I the Boy Scouts of America undertook selling war bonds to help the effort and 30 Chickasaw troops took up the cause. Troop 22, led by its top salesman/scout Charles Wailes, sold the most in the country and was recognized by President Woodrow Wilson. Young Wailes' support for the war effort did not end with bond sales. He also helped to identify a potential spy ring working for the German Empire. As a radio-telegraphy hobbyist, Wailes frequently monitored railroad and Mississippi River riverboat radio Morse code signals with his shortwave radio set. In the spring of 1917, Wailes began to hear seemingly random characters being broadcast via a very clear signal. He also owned a portable station-finder and carried it around the streets of Memphis, attempting to locate the mysterious signal. After several attempts, Wailes believed he had pinpointed the signal's source at a home on Vance Avenue and notified his scoutmaster, who phoned the Memphis office of the Justice Department. A search of the residence uncovered a German-made shortwave radio in the attic. The purported radio operator (whose occupation was listed only as "traveler") was arrested.

The Chickasaw Council became a leader in racial integration in Scouting. Bolton Smith, the first Council President, became the Vice President of the National Boy Scouts of America and helped form the National Committee on Interracial Activities in 1926. When Gordon Morris became Scout Executive in 1928 (in that position from 1928 to 1959), he brought J.A. Beauchamp to Memphis to organize the first African-American Troop, Troop 100 at Centenary Methodist Church. Beauchamp was the first African-American Scouting professional and was later hired by the Council in 1934. By 1943 the Council was commended by the National Director of Interracial Activities for becoming the sixth Council in the nation with more than 1000 African-American Scouts.

The Delta Area Council of Mississippi merged into the Chickasaw Council in January 1993.

Organization
The council is divided into 8 districts; as well as the Exploring programs.
 Eastern District
 Malmaison District
 Northwest Mississippi District
 Tallaha District
 Thunderbird District
 Twin Banks District
 Washington District
 Wolf River District

Camps

Kia Kima Scout Reservation

Kia Kima Scout Reservation is a nationally accredited Boy Scout summer camp in the foothills of the Ozarks in Hardy, Arkansas. The name "Kia Kima" means "Nest of the Eagles" in the Zuni language. Summer camp at Kia Kima generally begins during the 2nd week of June and runs through the second week of July. A Cub and Webelos Resident Camp is generally offered during the first week in June. There is also a winter camp offered which starts after Christmas and lasts several days. The reservation is split into three camps: Camp Osage, Camp Cherokee, and Ozark Venture Base. The original  206.28-acre (0.8348 km2) property now known as "Old Kia Kima" was donated by Bolton Smith in 1916. The site is located on a bluff overlooking the South Fork Spring River, near Hardy (in present-day Cherokee Village). Old Kia Kima is listed on the Arkansas Register of Historic Places.

Camp Currier

Camp Currier first opened in 1925 in Eudora, Mississippi. The camp was named for the late Charles C. Currier. Currier's wife, Elizabeth B. Currier donated the funds for the first payment on the property as well as the funds for the original swimming pool, original Mess Hall, and the dam. Elizabeth Currier was from Memphis and moved to Geneva, Switzerland in her later years.  Camp Currier is a  property owned and operated by the Chickasaw Council for many years. It was started as a full-year camping ground as opposed to Kia Kima which was only open during the summer. Beginning in 1940 and lasting into the 1950s Currier was used for the Chickasaw Council summer camp program due to its proximity to Memphis while Kia Kima was closed.

Camp Tallaha

The Delta Area Council opened Camp Tallaha in 1925. The camp had two artesian wells that were 3000 feet deep. After the Delta Area Council merged into the Chickasaw Council in 1993, Tallaha continued to operate as a second summer camp program in addition to Kia Kima Scout Reservation. The camp closed in 2002 and was sold in 2004.

Program and activities

Venturing Officers' Association
The Venturing Officers' Association (VOA) is an organization composed of the Chickasaw Council's Venturing Officers, Crew leaders, and advisers. It represents the non-traditional programs, such as Venturing and Sea Scouts. The VOA sponsors a fall and spring Council Venturing Weekend where all Venturers in the Council are invited to come together for activities ranging from climbing to shooting to canoeing and includes a fireside hangout on Saturday evening. The VOA also does substantial work towards growing Venturing, supporting Venture Crews and Sea Scouting Ships, and developing high-quality experiences for Venturing youth.

Scoutbase
Scoutbase was a Council-wide event, held every other year since the mid-1980s. This event, though local in nature, is nationally recognized and attracts numbers from 6,000-10,000 people from all over the country. The event, generally held in mid-October, was held at the Millington Naval Base until 2006, when it moved to the Paul Battle Jr. Arena area in Tunica, Mississippi, until at least 2014. The event had a number of events, activities, exhibitions, displays, and special shows. Scoutbase was generally held every other year. But was last held in 2014 and in 2016 the council decided not to do it due to funding reasons

Order of the Arrow

The Order of the Arrow is represented in Chickasaw Council by Ahoalan-Nachpikin Lodge No. 558 . This arm of Scouting's National Honor Society claims over 1000 members and is the second largest lodge in OA Southern Region Section 6. Ahoalan-Nachpikin is composed of six primary officers, 12-14 Committee Chairman, and their respective advisers. Ahoalan-Nachpikin promotes and hosts such events as LOAC (Lodge Order of the Arrow Conference, similar to NOAC), Fall Fellowship, and Ordeals.

History

Chickasah Lodge 406
The Chickasaw Council first began its honor society as the Order of Kamp Kia Kima or Council Scouts. Every week at summer camp the campers who best exemplified the Scout Oath and Law were led to a secret campfire circle in the woods and given an Indian name. They would then meet periodically throughout the year. In 1948 the Chickasaw Council adopted the Order of the Arrow as a part of its camping program. Chickasah Lodge of the Order of the Arrow was founded at Kia Kima and held its first Ordeal Ceremony there on August 7, 1948, by a ceremonial team from Ittawamba Lodge 235 of the West Tennessee Area Council. It adopted the Thunderbird as its lodge totem as the thunderbird was already the emblem of Kia Kima. Chickasah held its first Brotherhood Ceremony in the Spring of 1950. It then held its first Vigil Ceremony on December 14, 1952, at Camp Currier. In 1994, the last Chickasah lodge chief was Ken Kimble.

Koi Hatachie Lodge 345
Koi Hatachie was founded in 1946 by the Delta Area Council under the original name White Panther. The first Tap Out ceremony was at summer camp in July 1946 with the first meeting of the Lodge in December 1947. During Camp Tallaha's campfire programs, there was a legend of an old Choctaw Indian Chief and his constant companion, a white panther. After the Chief was killed, his white panther was said to continue to roam the land around the camp looking for his old master. The legend was so central to the camp that when the lodge was founded, the white panther was adopted as the totem and name. White Panther was used from 1946 to 1956 when the lodge changed its name to Koi Hatachie. Most Lodges had adopted Indian names and Lodge 345 wanted to conform. Koi Hatachie was thought to mean White Panther in the Choctaw language, however it was later realized to not actually have a meaning. In 1994, the last Koi Hatachie lodge chief was Thad Kelly

Lodge merger
When the Delta Area Council was merged into Chickasaw, the two Order of the Arrow lodges were also merged. In 1994 Fall Fellowship was a joint event between the Koi Hatachie and Chickasah lodges. The fall elections were held during the fellowship at Camp Tallaha, located outside Charleston, MS, to select the new Lodge Executive Council . It was agreed to have a balanced representation of leadership from the two merged lodges. After Brad Stevens from Chickasah was elected Lodge Chief, nominations were then limited to members of Koi Hatachie for 1st Vice Chief, in which Felder Davis then was elected. All the other offices were open to arrowmen from either lodge. Only the position of 2nd Vice Chief ran opposed, in which Chuck Barber was elected. The event offered identically designed pocket and back patches featuring the combined totems of the Thunderbird and White Panther.

Later, the newly elected lodge officers met at the Chickasaw Council office to determine the new lodge totem and name. After several attempts, they selected the black bear and the name Ahoalan-Nachpikin, which means "We Who Love the Outdoors" in Lenni Lenape. The new lodge was officially chartered on January 1, 1995. It was a member of Section SR-9 from 1995 to 1997. It was then moved to Section 6-N which later became Section SR-6.

Chapters

See also
Kia Kima Scout Reservation
Scouting in Tennessee
Scouting in Mississippi
Scouting in Arkansas

External links
 Chickasaw Council
 Kia Kima Scout Reservation
 Ahoalan-Nachpikin Lodge 558
 Kia Kima Alumni Association
 Old Kia Kima Preservation Association

References

Local councils of the Boy Scouts of America
Organizations based in Memphis, Tennessee
Southern Region (Boy Scouts of America)
Youth organizations based in Tennessee
1916 establishments in Tennessee
Organizations established in 1916